The 1886 Manitoba general election and was held on December 9, 1886.

1886
1886 elections in Canada
1886 in Manitoba
December 1886 events